The 2020 ICC Under-19 Cricket World Cup was an international limited-overs cricket tournament that was held in South Africa from 17 January to 9 February 2020. It was the thirteenth edition of the Under-19 Cricket World Cup, and the second to be held in South Africa. Sixteen teams took part in the tournament, split into four groups of four. The top two teams from each group advanced to the Super League, with the bottom two teams in each group progressing to the Plate League. India were the defending champions.

In the first Super League semi-final, India beat Pakistan by ten wickets to advance to the final, with Yashasvi Jaiswal scoring an unbeaten century. In the second Super League semi-final, Bangladesh beat New Zealand by six wickets, with Mahmudul Hasan Joy scoring a century. The third-place playoff match between Pakistan and New Zealand was abandoned without a ball being bowled due to rain. Therefore, Pakistan finished in third place, after scoring more points than New Zealand in the group stage of the tournament.

In the final, India batted first and were all out for 177 runs in 47.2 overs. Due to a rain interruption, Bangladesh were set a revised target of 170 runs from 46 overs, per the DLS method, which Bangladesh chased down in 42.1 overs. Bangladesh beat India by three wickets to win the tournament. It was Bangladesh's first win in an ICC event at any level.

Qualification

The top eleven full members of the International Cricket Council (ICC) at the 2018 World Cup qualified automatically for the 2020 tournament; Ireland were the only full member to fail to qualify automatically. They were joined by the winners of the five regional qualification tournaments. Fifty teams took part in the qualification pathway matches during 2018 and 2019. The first qualification matches took place in the Europe Division 2 group at various club cricket grounds in Essex and Hertfordshire, England, on 31 July 2018. The final round of qualification fixtures took place in the Netherlands in July & August 2019.

Nigeria became the first team to win their regional qualification group, and qualified for the Under-19 Cricket World Cup for the first time in their history. Japan also qualified for the Under-19 Cricket World Cup for the first time in their history. Japan were scheduled to play Papua New Guinea in their final qualification fixture, but Papua New Guinea forfeited the match. The Papua New Guinea Cricket Board later suspended ten of the players for a year, after bringing the game into disrepute following a shoplifting incident. Canada, Scotland and the United Arab Emirates were the remaining three teams to secure qualification.

Umpires
On 7 January 2020, the ICC appointed the officials for the tournament. Along with the sixteen umpires, Graeme Labrooy, Shaid Wadvalla and Phil Whitticase were also named as the match referees.

 Roland Black
 Iknow Chabi
 Anil Chaudhary
 Nigel Duguid
 Ian Gould
 Adrian Holdstock

 Bongani Jele
 Wayne Knights
 Sam Nogajski
 Ahmed Shah Pakteen
 Masudur Rahman

 Leslie Reifer
 Rashid Riaz
 Sharfuddoula
 Raveendra Wimalasiri
 Asif Yaqoob

Squads

Group stage
The fixtures for the tournament were confirmed by the ICC on 24 October 2019.

Group A

Group B

Group C

Group D

Plate League

Plate quarter-finals

Plate playoff semi-finals

Plate semi-finals

Super League

Super League quarter-finals

Super League playoff semi-finals

Super League semi-finals

Placement matches

15th-place playoff

13th-place playoff

11th-place playoff

9th-place playoff (Plate Final)

7th-place playoff

5th-place playoff

3rd-place playoff

Final

Final standings

References

External links
 Series home at ESPNcricinfo

ICC Under-19 Cricket World Cup
International cricket competitions in 2019–20
International cricket competitions in South Africa
 
2020 in South African sport
Cricket World Cup
Cricket World Cup